Euphiuche picta is a species of moth of the family Noctuidae first described by Frederic Moore in 1882. It is known from India, Thailand, Peninsular Malaysia, Sumatra, Java, Borneo and Sulawesi.

References

Hypeninae